Hume is a village in Berwickshire, in the Scottish Borders area of Scotland. It is close to other villages and amenities, e.g. Brotherstone Hill, Smailholm, Smailholm Tower, Floors Castle, Stichill, Lambden, Nenthorn, Ednam, Birgham and Gordon.

See also
Hume Castle
Hume Crags
List of places in the Scottish Borders

External links

SCRAN image: Hume, Scottish Borders
SCRAN Image: Duke of Buccleugh's Hunt meet at Hume
Ordnance Survey Map for Hume and Hume Crags
Geograph photo 698169: Hume, village street, viewed from the ramparts of Hume Castle
A Vision of Britain: Hume, Berwickshire

Villages in the Scottish Borders
Berwickshire